Sexton is an unincorporated community in Center Township, Rush County, in the U.S. state of Indiana.

History
An old variant name of the community was called Hamilton. The community was laid out as Hamilton Station in 1883 as a stop on the railroad.

A post office was established under the name Sexton in 1882, and remained in operation until it was discontinued in 1903.

Geography

References

Unincorporated communities in Rush County, Indiana
Unincorporated communities in Indiana